is an anime OVA.

In the far away future, the unison of witchcraft and science brought great changes
to mankind. On the moon, the elite of magic and science has been gathered and the
"Magic Town Sorcerium" built. Day by day, research is done and big wealth awarded to
human race. However, this prosperity also brings with it a fight for those interests
and leads finally to the "Big Magic War" between earth and moon, which causes the
downfall of glory.

The few surviving humans start to rebuild a new civilization. But forbidden arms(DNA -attackers and -changers) that were used in the big magic war left deep scars
and several obscurities like giant creatures and others threaten the humans, being
weak having lost all magic and science. Scared as they are, all they wish for is
that this terror comes to an end. However, there is someone contrary to those terrors
- "Heaven" sent "Angels", girls with special powers who are sent to various points in history to put things right. This thrilling story describes how the fighting girls
protect humanity from terror. But despite the existence of them, the deep darkness
is spreading.

Lasty Farson, code name Angel Rabbie, is our clumsy and ever-hungry heroine. On her first day, she's late but when trouble strikes, she's sent from the station down to the planet and helps a group of villagers clear out a woman and her gang stealing food and treasure from the people. At the same time, she learns Lukia Shawl, a missing comrade it seems is somehow involved or at least up to something of her own (she'd been missing so long, she was presumed dead).

External links

2004 anime OVAs
Anime International Company
Magical girl anime and manga